The Norwalk Transit District is the primary provider of public transportation services in Norwalk, Connecticut, United States, and surrounding communities. The local Norwalk fixed-route bus transit system, known as WHEELS, is the primary service of the district linking Norwalk and its immediate suburbs. The agency also operates regional bus services as far north as Danbury (with HARTransit) and as far east as Bridgeport (with GBT) and commuter shuttles to Metro-North stations. Paratransit door-to-door services are available for residents in the service area unable to use regular transit services. Norwalk Transit contracts with local transportation service providers to perform some of the door-to-door services, and is also the provider of public transit for the Westport Transit District.

The city of Norwalk founded the Norwalk Transit District in 1978, seven years after the Connecticut Company ceased operations in Norwalk outside of their route linking Norwalk to Stamford (which continues as Connecticut Transit Stamford Route 41). The district receives local, federal and state funding from the Connecticut Department of Transportation.

Routes
Norwalk Transit operates fixed routes throughout Norwalk, Westport and Greenwich, CT. A "pulse-point" system is used with all Norwalk routes meeting at the "WHEELS Hub" in downtown Norwalk to facilitate instant transfers between local Norwalk routes and regional connections such as CT Transit Route 341. Passengers on WHEELS routes 11 and 13 can transfer in shared service areas along U.S. Route 1. Fares as of 2017 are $1.75 (US) for a 90-minute unlimited pass.

WHEELS services
8 fixed route services, 1 School Tripper and 1 Shuttle, all in the city limits of Norwalk, run as bidirectional loops from the transit hub, starting at approximately 5:00 am and ending at 8:00 pm weekdays. Weekend services operate from 7:00 am to 7:00 pm. Only Routes 3,7,9,10,11,13 run on Saturdays
1 - West Norwalk
3 - Route 7 / Glover Ave (Skips GLover Ave on Saturdays, bus turns around at Walmart Route 7)
4 - Wilton Center
7 - Strawberry Hill Ave / Calf Pasture Beach
9 - Hospital/ South Norwalk
10- South Norwalk RR Stn/ Wilson Ave
11- Crosstown to Norwalk Community College
13- NCC via CT Ave
15- School Trip: Norwalk High
 Highland Ave Express- Roton Middle School via South Norwalk RR Stn (Replacement for Wheels Route 12)

Evening and weekend shuttles
Two year round shuttles that operate in the evenings and all day Sunday as a replacement for fixed route service. They operating hours are Monday- Friday 7pm-10:30pm, Saturday 6:30pm–9:30pm and Sunday 8:30am– 7:30pm. There is one seasonal shuttle that runs to the beach on Sundays only during the summer months from 8:30am-5pm.
 Connecticut Ave Shuttle: Goes to South Norwalk Railroad Station and Norwalk Transit District offices and to NCC via Connecticut Ave. Its a replica of WHEELS routes 10 and 13.
 Main Ave Shuttle: Goes to Woodward Ave and to Main Ave\ Route 7 to Walmart where the bus turns around, its a replica of WHEELS route 3 and 9.
 Calf Pasture Beach Shuttle (June–September): Seasonal Shuttle that runs to Calf Pasture Beach via East Ave, Its a replica of the discontinued WHEELS route 8.

Regional connections
 Route 7 Link: Danbury-Norwalk via Route 7 . It is operated exclusively by Housatonic Area Regional Transit. Formerly a joint route operated by both HART and NTD but due to low ridership NTD discontinued their trips on January 23, 2018.
 Coastal Link: Norwalk to Milford via Route 1. This route is operated by Norwalk Transit District in partnership with Greater Bridgeport Transit and Milford Transit District.
 Transfers with CT Transit Route 341 at the WHEELS Hub

Norwalk commuter shuttles
Four Commuter shuttles that operate during rush hour (7am-10am and 3:30pm–6:30pm) from South Norwalk Railroad Station to their respective destinations.
 Norwalk Hospital/Belden Avenue
 Merritt 7/Glover Avenue
 Westport Road/Wilton
 Norwalk Community College/Connecticut Ave (Operates AM Rush only)

Westport commuter shuttles
Seven routes operate during peak train times to and from Westport residential and commercial areas and Sauguatuck Metro-North Station and Greens Farm Metro-North Station.
 S1- Jesup Green/ Post Rd
 S2- Old Hill Rd/ Newtown Turnpike
 S3- Weston Rd/ Compo Rd
 S4 Hills Point Rd/ Compo Beach
 G1- North Ave/ Coleytown
 G2- Bayberry Lane/ Sturges Highway
 IPL- Imperial Ave Shuttle

Greenwich commuter shuttles
Two Commuter Shuttles that operate during Rush hour out of Greenwich Railroad Station.
 Central Loop
 West Loop

Door-to-door services
 Norwalk Transit directly operates and contracts with a number of local operators to provide ADA and Paratrasit service for much of Fairfield County.

Fleet

Paratransit van fleet

References

External links

 Norwalk Transit District homepage
 Follow Norwalk Transit District buses in real-time at MyStop
 Norwalk Transit District/Wheels Gallery (BusTalk)

Bus transportation in Connecticut
Organizations established in 1978
Norwalk, Connecticut
Transportation in Fairfield County, Connecticut
Transit agencies in Connecticut
1978 establishments in Connecticut